The Embassy of Sweden in Prague is Sweden's diplomatic mission in the Czech Republic. It's located on Úvoz street, in Hradčany, the castle region of Prague. It is close to the Strahov Monastery. The embassy has a great view of the rest of Prague because it is located up on the hill. A pedestrian path, named after Swedish diplomat Raoul Wallenberg, who saved thousands of Jews from the Holocaust, leads from embassy up to the Petrin Hill.

Building
In the 1920s, the embassy was located at Snêmovni ulice n:o 5. In 1946, the embassy moved to where it is located today, on Úvoz 13. In everyday speech, the building has always been called Na Krásné Vyhlidce - the beautiful view. It was built in 1928-29 by Dr. Josef Ruzicka and his wife Anna. They borrowed money from Joseph's father and showed their gratitude by having a bronze portrait of him engraved on the facade facing the garden. This was done by the best engraver in Prague - Otakar Španiel - and it is still in place.

During the 1948 Czechoslovak coup d'état, this house, like all other real estate, was confiscated. The man who had it built died in one of the Nazi concentration camps. The house was divided and taken over by a couple of relatives. The former owner's daughter, who owned half the house, emigrated to California, but her mother and mother-in-law were able to stay. The Swedish embassy continued to rent the house, but now from the Czech state. The Swedish state was offered to buy the house but they refused because it was considered that the house had been confiscated illegally. When the communist regime fell, the Czech state returned all real property to previous owners. The Ruziska family got their palace back. The now seventy-year-old lady in California donated her share, half the house, to the Swedish state. The Swedish state bought the other half of the palace for SEK 15 million.

Building

The house was built in 1928-29 and was designed by the architect Tomas Sasek who managed to make it fit in stylistically with the surrounding baroque architecture. One of the obstacles to the construction was that the popular tavern Na krásné vyhlídce ("The beautiful view") had to be demolished to make room. Initially, the house was intended as a single-family house, but eventually a large building was created with room for four families.

Sasek apparently got their hands free and the building became very lavish. In recent years, the National Property Board of Sweden (SFV) has carried out a complete renovation of the property. Today it houses the embassy chancery, the ambassadaoral residence and three staff residences. In 2013, SFV carried out basic reinforcement of the lower part of the property and renovation work on the embassy's facades.

Heads of Mission

References

External links

Sweden
Prague
Czech Republic–Sweden relations
Czechoslovakia–Sweden relations